Bridge in East Fallowfield Township may refer to:

Bridge in East Fallowfield Township (Atlantic, Pennsylvania), listed on the National Register of Historic Places in Crawford County, Pennsylvania
Bridge in East Fallowfield Township (Mortonville, Pennsylvania), listed on the National Register of Historic Places in Chester County, Pennsylvania